This is a list of choirs that sing at least part of their repertoire in a Celtic language. Celtic choirs keep alive Celtic music traditions and language, bringing them to a wider audience and reinforcing the learning of Celtic languages.  Choirs compete at Celtic festivals such as the National Mod in Scotland and Welsh Eisteddfod. The London Welsh Male Voice Choir and the London Welsh Rugby Club Choir sang the Olympic Anthem at the closing ceremony of the 2012 London Olympics. For choirs in the UK, please see the separate entries for each country.

The choirs sing in Breton (Brezhoneg), Cornish (Kernewek), Irish (Gaeilge), Manx Gaelic (Gaelg), Scottish Gaelic (Gaidhlig) or Welsh (Cymraeg).

Celtic choirs by country

Argentina
 Ceolraidh, the only choir in Latin America devoted to singing, promoting and keeping Scottish Gaelic language and music traditions alive  
 Tirn Aill, chamber vocal group of Celtic music and ethnic music - (Buenos Aires)

Australia
 Australian Celtic Singers in Newcastle, New South Wales – all Celtic languages
 Australian Gaelic Singers / Còisir Ghàidhlig Astràilianach in Sydney, New South Wales – (Scottish Gaelic)
 Còisir Ghàidhlig Bhioctoria (Scottish Gaelic Choir of Victoria) in Melbourne, Victoria – (Scottish Gaelic)
 Melbourne Welsh Male Choir in Melbourne, Victoria – (Welsh)
 Australian Welsh Male Choir / Côr Meibion Cymreig Awstralia in Frankston, Victoria – (Welsh)
 Victoria Welsh Male Choir / Cantorion Cymreig in Melbourne, Victoria and Bendigo, Victoria – (Welsh)
 Cantorion Sydney Choir in Sydney, New South Wales – (Welsh)
 Celtic Connection Choir in Brisbane, Queensland – all Celtic languages
 Sydney Welsh Choir in Sydney, New South Wales – (Welsh)

Brittany
 Ensemble Choral du Bout du Monde  – (Breton)
 Chœur Homme Bretagne – (Breton)

Canada
 Vancouver Gaelic Choir in Vancouver, British Columbia – (Scottish Gaelic)
 Toronto Welsh Male Voice Choir in Greater Toronto Area, Toronto Ontario – Croeso! (Welcome)
 Burlington Welsh Male Chorus, Burlington Ontario Canada
 Mouth Music/Musique à Bouche, Celtic Choir, Montreal, Qc

Cornwall

 St Mary's Singers of Truro Cathedral in Truro Cathedral, Truro – (Cornish)

England (except Cornwall)
 Coisir Lunnain – London Gaelic Choir – (Scottish Gaelic)
 Côr Meibion Cymry Llundain – London Welsh Male Voice Choir – (Welsh)
 Gaelic Voices Choir - London - (Irish Gaelic)
 Gwalia Male Voice Choir in London - (Welsh)
 London Welsh Male Voice Choir - (Welsh)
 London Welsh Rugby Club Choir - (Welsh)
 Oxford Welsh Male Voice Choir - (Welsh)
 Rushmoor Male Voice Choir in Surrey/Hants - (Welsh)

France
See Brittany

Ireland
 Anúna Celtic Choir – (Irish Gaelic)

Isle of Man
 Caarjyn Cooidjagh – (Manx Gaelic) CD releases Cronnane (1999) Carval Chreneash (2004) Skellyn (2008)
 Cliogaree Twoaie – (Manx Gaelic) 'Northern Croakers' CD releases Drogh Vraane and a few good men (2005) and Nollick Ghennal (2006)

Scotland

 Còisir Dhùn Èideann (Edinburgh Gaelic Choir – (Scottish Gaelic)
 Còisir Gàidhlig Nàiseanta (in English: National Gaelic Choir)
 Coisir Ghaidhlig an Eilein Mhuilich, the Isle of Mull Gaelic Choir – (Scottish Gaelic)
 Coisir Sgir a' Bhac
Coisir Sgire Phortrigh - Portree
 Dingwall Gaelic Choir – Dingwall
 Govan Gaelic Choir - Govan, Lanarkshire
 Inverness Gaelic Choir
 Lothian Gaelic Choir
 Strath Gaelic Choir
 Taynuilt Gaelic Choir – Taynuilt

South Africa
 Welsh Male Voice Choir of South Africa – (Welsh)

United States
 Choir of Southern California Côr Cymraeg De Califfornia in Southern California – (Welsh)

Wales

 Barry, Vale of Glamorgan Barry Male Voice Choir
 Côr Dathlu Cwmtawe
 Côr Godre'r Aran, Llanuwchllyn
 Côr Meibion Dowlais
 Côr Meibion Froncysyllte Male Voice Choir
 Côr Meibion Llanelli
 Côr Meibion Pontypridd
 Cwmbach Male Choir
 Cytgan
 Gwalia Singers
 Hogia'r Ddwylan – Anglesey
 Morriston Orpheus Choir – Morriston Orpheus Choir – (Welsh)
 Pontarddulais Male Choir
 Treorchy Male Choir

References

External links
 Gaelic Choirs in Scotland | The Association of Gaelic Choirs

Breton language
Cornish language
Irish language
Manx language
Welsh language
Breton music
Cornish music
Irish music
Manx music
Scottish music
Welsh music
Scottish Gaelic music
Celtic language-related lists